Ivan Venkov Kolev (born 14 July 1957) is a Bulgarian former football player and current manager.

He coached several Indonesian clubs such as, Persija Jakarta, Mitra Kukar, and Persipura Jayapura. Between 2012 and 2013, he coached Yangon United.

2007 Asian Cup 
In 2007 Asian Cup, Kolev was the coach of Indonesia which played in Group D along with Korea Republic, Bahrain and Saudi Arabian's team. Indonesia won 2-1 of Bahrain, lost 1-2 by Saudi Arabia, and lost again in last matches of groups by South Korea with 0–1.

Loko Sofia 
In June 2020, he was announced as manager of Lokomotiv Sofia on a one-year contract.

Managerial statistics

Honours

Manager 
Indonesia
 AFF Championship runner-up: 2002

Myanmar
 AFF Championship fourth place: 2004

Sriwijaya
 Indonesian Community Shield: 2010
 Inter Island Cup: 2010

Yangon United
 Myanmar National League: 2012, 2013

References 

1957 births
Living people
Bulgarian footballers
Bulgarian football managers
Bulgarian expatriate football managers
Myanmar national football team managers
Bulgarian expatriate sportspeople in Myanmar
Indonesia national football team managers
Bulgarian expatriate sportspeople in Indonesia
2004 AFC Asian Cup managers
2007 AFC Asian Cup managers
Association football midfielders